Pangoniinae is a subfamily of horse-flies in the order Diptera, containing at least four tribes and 24 genera.

Insects in this subfamily are distinguished from other Tabanidae by possession of ocelli and the antennal flagellum usually has eight rings.

Tribes and genera

Goniopsini
Tribe Goniopsini Lessard, 2014
Goniops Aldrich, 1892

Mycteromyiini
Caenopangonia Kröber, 1930

Pangoniini 
Many Neotropical
Tribe Pangoniini
Apatolestes Williston, 1885
Asaphomyia Stone, 1953
Austroplex Mackerras, 1955
Brennania Philip, 1941
Caenoprosopon Ricardo, 1915
Ectenopsis Macquart, 1838
Esenbeckia Rondani, 1863
Nagatomyia Murdoch & Takashasi, 1961
Pangonius Latreille, 1802
Pegasomyia Burger, 1985
Protosilvius Enderlein, 1922
Stonemyia Brennan, 1935
Therevopangonia Mackerras, 1955

Philolichini
Tribe Philolichini
Philoliche Wiedemann, 1920

Scionini

Tribe Scionini
Anzomyia Lessard, 2012
Aotearomyia  Lessard, 2014
Apocampta Schiner, 1868
Copidapha Enderlein, 1922
Fidena Walker, 1850
Lepmia Fairchild, 1969
Myioscaptia Mackerras, 1955
Osca Walker, 1850
Palimmecomyia Taylor, 1917
Parosca Enderlein, 1922
Pityocera Giglio-Tos, 1896
Plinthina Walker, 1850
Pseudomelpia Enderlein, 1922
Pseudoscione Lutz, 1918
Scaptia Walker, 1850
Plinthina Walker, 1850
Scione Walker, 1850
Triclista Enderlein, 1922

Scepsidini
Tribe Scepsidini
Scepsis Walker, 1850

Incertae sedis
Zophina  Philip, 1954

References

External links
 
 

Tabanidae
Brachycera subfamilies
Taxa named by Hermann Loew